The Islamic State – Algeria Province (IS-AP; , ad-Dawlah al-Islāmiyah – Wilayah al-Jazā’ir) is a branch of the militant Islamist group Islamic State (IS), active in Algeria. The group was formerly known as Jund al-Khilafah fi Ard al-Jazair (meaning Soldiers of the Caliphate in the land of Algeria or Caliphate Soldiers of Algeria).

After kidnapping a 55-year-old French mountaineering guide, Hervé Gourdel, the group stated in a video on 22 September 2014, that the kidnapping was a fulfilling of an order of IS spokesman al-'Adnani to attack citizens of countries fighting with the U.S. against IS. On 24 September 2014, Wilayah al-Jazair claimed to have beheaded Hervé Gourdel.

It is classified as a terror group by the UK, as well as by the US under the name Jund al-Khilafah (JAK-A). Also Kazakhstan and Kyrgyzstan designated the group as terrorist.

History

Under Al-Qaeda in the Islamic Maghreb
Wilayah al-Jazair was previously a faction of al-Qaeda in the Islamic Maghreb, the Al Qaeda affiliate in North and West Africa. AQIM grew out of Algerian Islamist groups that had fought in the 1990s Civil War. Abdelmalek Gouri (who would later lead Jund al-Khilafah) was formerly the "right-hand man" of Abdelmalek Droukdel, who was the leader of AQIM. Gouri was also part of an AQIM cell responsible for suicide attacks on the government's headquarters and the UN compound in Algiers in 2007. He was also behind an attack in Iboudrarene in April 2014 that left 11 Algerian soldiers dead.

As Jund al-Khilafah
On 14 September 2014, the leader of al-Qaeda in the Islamic Maghreb (AQIM) in the central region, Khaled Abu Suleiman (nom de guerre of Abdelmalek Gouri), announced in a communique he was breaking allegiance with Al-Qaeda and took an oath of allegiance to the leader of the Islamic State, Abu Bakr al-Baghdadi. He was reportedly joined by an AQIM commander of an eastern region of Algeria. He claimed that other members of AQIM had "deviated from the right path" and declared to al-Baghdadi "You have in the Islamic Maghreb men who will obey your orders."

As Wilayah al-Jazair
On 13 November 2014, Abu Bakr al-Baghdadi announced that the group had changed its name to "Wilayah al-Jazair" in accordance to the structure of the rest of groups aligned with IS. In December 2014, Gourdel's killer was killed by Algerian security forces. In May 2015, over 20 members of the group, including commanders, were killed in a military raid. The group was devastated by the raids, and turned its focus to propaganda while attempting to rebuild. Although it advertised the pledges of allegiance of several AQIM splinter factions during 2015, none of the groups involved are believed to be large, and the group did not claim responsibility for any attacks in the year following the kidnapping and killing of Gourdel.

Timeline
 April 2014: Jund al-Khilafah ambushes Algerian army convoy in Iboudrarene, killing 11 Algerian soldiers and wounding 5.
 14 September 2014: Jund al-Khilafah leader Khaled Abu-Suleiman announces the group's split from al-Qaeda in the Islamic Maghreb, and pledges allegiance to Abu Bakr al-Baghdadi, leader of the Islamic State of Iraq and the Levant.
 21 September 2014: Hervé Gourdel is abducted by Jund al-Khilafah in the Djurdjura National Park in Algeria.
 22 September 2014: Jund al-Khilafah releases a video showing Hervé Gourdel being held captive. The group stated that the kidnapping was in response to France conducting Airstrikes against "Islamic State" and threatened to behead him if France continued to carry out airstrikes against IS.
 24 September 2014: The group releases a video purporting to show the beheading of Hervé Gourdel. The militants shown stated that the beheading was in response to the order of IS spokesman Abu Mohammed al-Adnani, in which he called on followers to attack citizens of member nations of the anti-IS coalition.
 October 2014: One of the Jund al-Khilafah militants responsible for the beheading of Hervé Gourdel was killed in an Algerian military operation in October.
 11 December 2014: The Algerian justice ministry states that Algerian soldiers had killed two Wilayah al-Jazair members believed to have been involved in the murder of Hervé Gourdel.
 20 December 2014: Algerian soldiers kill three Wilayah al-Jazair members in the mountains near Sidi Daoud.
 22 December 2014: Wilayah al-Jazair leader Abdelmalek Gouri and two other militants were killed by the Algerian army in a military operation in Issers. Afterwards, troops recovered two automatic rifles, explosive belts, and a large amount of ammunition and mobile phones.
 28 April 2015: The Algerian military killed five Wilayah al-Jazair militants in an ambush in the region of Tizi Ouzou, east of Algiers.
 20 May 2015: Algerian security forces ambushed a Wilayah al-Jazair meeting east of Algiers, killing at least 21 fighters and capturing two others.
26 June 2015: A terrorist attack organized by IS resulted in 38 deaths in Sousse.
 20 February 2016: Wilayah al-Jazair claimed to have killed three Algerian soldiers in Mount Shakshut in Bouira in late February. This claim was denied by the Algerian government.

References

Factions of the Islamic State of Iraq and the Levant
Organizations designated as terrorist by the United States
Jihadist groups in Algeria
Terrorism in Algeria
Islamic terrorism in Algeria
Organisations designated as terrorist by the United Kingdom
Salafi Jihadist groups